All That Man Is is a 2016 novel by David Szalay. It is a collection of nine, intertwined short stories.

In September 2016, it was shortlisted for the 2016 Man Booker Prize and won the 2016 Gordon Burn Prize.

Awards and honors
2016 Man Booker Prize, shortlistee.
2016 Gordon Burn Prize, winner

References

2016 British novels
Jonathan Cape books